Bloods & Crips was an American gangsta rap group from Los Angeles County mostly known for their record selling song "Piru Love".

History 
The success of N.W.A. had frustrated many in the gang community who saw the group capitalizing on the gang lifestyle. The Bloods & Crips project was originally organized by rappers O.Y.G Redrum 781 and Tweedy Bird Loc. Actual gang members — Crips from Compton, Watts and Long Beach, and Bloods from Inglewood and Los Angeles — auditioned for the group and the best ones were chosen for the album. In 1993, the Bloods & Crips released their debut album entitled Bangin' on Wax for Warlock Records. One year later, the group's second and final studio album, Bangin' on Wax 2... The Saga Continues was released. After Bangin' on Wax 2, the Bloods & Crips parted ways, with the Bloods becoming the Damu Ridas and the Crips became the Nationwide Rip Ridaz.

Albums

First 
Bangin' on Wax was the first album by Bloods & Crips. The album was released in 1993 under Dangerous Records. Bangin' on Wax was a success, making it to No. 86 on the Billboard 200. Four singles were released "Bangin' on Wax", "Piru Love", "Crip, Crip, Crip" and "Steady Dippin'". The album went on to sell over 500,000 copies, achieving Gold status. Official music videos for "Bangin' on Wax", "Piru Love" and "Steady Dippin'" were made, gaining widespread attention for the group.

On the group's single "Piru Love", the hook is sung by Fo' Clips Eclipse, one of the group's Crip members.

The next single, "Steady Dippin'", was performed by Crip members Do Or Die (a.k.a. A-Love), Miss C-Note (a.k.a. Dannygirl), Sin Loc, and Blue Ragg (a.k.a. The General). They emerged a group called the Underworld Connection. The Underworld Connection was formed in the early 1990s but was put on hold for projects like Tweedy Bird Loc's "187 Ride By" and the controversial album Bangin' On Wax. It was the first time the group reconnected in the late 2000s since the 1990s. Also DJ Battlecat made an appearance in the "Steady Dippin'" music video as the event's DJ for the intro. The song was produced by him along with QLuso and Ronnie Ron.

Second 
Bangin' on Wax 2... The Saga Continues was the second and last album by the Bloods & Crips. Music videos were made for the album singles "G's & Locs" and "Wish You Were Here". Both videos gained positive reviews. The album was recorded and released in 1994 under Dangerous Records. The album made it to No. 139 on the Billboard 200 and #20 for Top R&B/Hip-Hop Albums.

Third

A third album: Bangin’ on Wax Part 3: No Passes was originally recorded in 2004, but not released until 2014. None of the original artists are featured on the album, although it was still distributed through Dangerous Records with the help of Tweedy Bird Loc, following the death of producer Ronnie M. Phillips on November 1, 2003, over a decade prior to release.

Aftermath 
Following the end of the project, the two gangs started separate projects, with the Crips releasing albums under the Nationwide Rip Ridaz name, and the bloods under the Damu Ridas.

Nationwide Rip Ridaz

The Nationwide Rip Ridaz released two albums, the self titled ‘Nationwide Rip Ridaz’ in 1995 and ‘Betrayed (Can't Trust Nobody)’ in 1999.

A notable member of the group was Donald “AWOL” Stallworth from Kelly Park, he was killed by law enforcement on June 4, 1997.

Damu Ridas

Damu Ridas released their own self titled album ‘Damu Ridas’ in 1995, followed by ‘How Deep Is Your Hood’ in 1999.

The core members of the Damu Ridas were from two different Blood gangs: the L.A. Denver Lane Bloods and the Crenshaw Mafia Bloods. The two gangs have been close allies for decades and are still allied today.

B-Brazy, Peanut II and Lil' Laniak II were from the Denver Lanes. Tip Toe, Pimp D, Spyder, O.G Mad Eye, Big Hawk and Lil' Hawk were from the Crenshaw Mafia. Of those 9 members, 7 have been confirmed deceased.

B-Brazy was shot and killed in 2003. Peanut II was shot 17 times and died in November 1995 by members of the Crips. Lil' Laniak II was with his daughter when he was killed around 1995 by the 83 Gangsters. Tip Toe was killed by a member of the Neighborhood Piru. Spyder was in the neighborhood of the Rollin' 60 Crips when he was shot and killed in 2000. O.G Mad Eye and his little brother Lil' Mad Eye were both killed before 2001. Big Hawk is deceased and Lil' Hawk is serving a 25 to life prison sentence for murder.

Members 
 Tweedy Bird Loc
Battlecat
Domino
 AWOL (Donald Stallworth)
Redrum
 O.Y.G Redrum 781
 B-Brazy
 Lenys Alias el Gluteos (Bloody Mary)
 Cixx Pac
 Miss C-Note
 Sin Loc
 Bobby Williams (Lil' Hawk)
 Lil' Leak (CK)
 Green Eyez
 Twin Loc (O.G. Cell-E-Cel)
 Big Freeze 
 G-Len
 B.G. Scarface
 Peanut 1
 Peanut II
 Big Mad-Eyez
 Samari Doby (Lil' Stretch)
 Tip-Toe
 Broncoe
 Koolay
 June Dawg
 Batman (Evil Bat)
 G-Spyder
 Blue Ragg
 Do or Die
 Lil’ 8
 Baby Maniak
 Lil' CK Stretch
 Robert W. Lewis III (Producer)
 Gangsta Red
 Gangsta Yank
 Big Stretch
 Baby Stretch
 Big Hawk
 Baby Hawk
 Big Wy (Red Rag)
 Green AK

Discography 
 Bangin' on Wax (1993)
 Bangin' on Wax 2... The Saga Continues (1994)
Bangin’ on Wax Part 3: No Passes (2014)

See also 
 Crime in Los Angeles
Nationwide Rip Ridaz (album)
Damu Ridas (album)

References

External links 
 Warlock Records & Dangerous Records official site.
 Bloods & Crips  at Billboard.
 
 .

1993 establishments in California
Bloods
Crips
Musical groups established in 1993
Musical groups disestablished in 1994
Musical groups from Los Angeles
Hip hop groups from California
Gangsta rap groups
G-funk groups